The St. Galler Elite Challenge is an annual tournament on the men's women's World Curling Tour. It is held annually in January at Curling Center St. Gallen in St. Gallen, Switzerland.  

The purse for the event is CHF 7,000 for the men's event and CHF 6,600 for the women's event. Its event classification is 100.

The event has been held since 2022. The 2023 event consisted of 27 teams from 10 countries.  

St. Gallen previously hosted the Euronics European Masters World Curling Tour event, last held in 2017.

Men's champions

Women's champions

References

External links
Official site (2023) 

World Curling Tour events
Curling competitions in Switzerland
Sport in St. Gallen (city)